Viitaniemi is a neighborhood in the Nisula district of Jyväskylä, Finland. It was built during 1959–1964. In 1962, the landmark of the suburb, Viitatorni designed by Alvar Aalto, was built. Viitaniemi is considered to be an architecturally significant area.

Gallery

References 

Neighbourhoods of Jyväskylä